Kirklington may refer to:
Kirklington, North Yorkshire, England
Kirklington, Nottinghamshire, England

See also
Kirklinton, Cumbria, England
Kirtlington, Oxfordshire, England